The 2016 Gainesville mayoral election was held on March 15, 2016 to elect the Mayor of Gainesville. The election coincided with the Democratic and Republican presidential primaries.

City Commissioner Lauren Poe defeated an Incumbent Ed Braddy by a large margin. This can most-likely be attributed to the 29.4% increase in turnout from 2013.

Results

References

Gainesville Mayor
Gainesville
History of Gainesville, Florida